, also known as Taboo, is a 1999 Japanese film directed by Nagisa Ōshima. It is about homosexuality in the Shinsengumi during the bakumatsu period, the end of the samurai era in the mid-19th century.

Plot
At the start of the movie, the young and handsome Kanō Sōzaburō (Ryuhei Matsuda) is admitted to the Shinsengumi, an elite samurai group led by Kondō Isami (Yoichi Sai) that seeks to defend the Tokugawa shogunate against reformist forces. He is a very skilled swordsman, but it is his appearance that makes many of the others in the (strictly male) group, both students and superiors, attracted to him, creating tension within the group of people vying for Kanō's affections.

Cast
 Takeshi Kitano as Vice-Commander Hijikata Toshizō
 Ryuhei Matsuda as Kanō Sōzaburō
 Shinji Takeda as Captain Okita Sōji
 Tadanobu Asano as Hyōzō Tashiro
 Yoichi Sai as Commander Kondō Isami
 Koji Matoba as Sugano Heibei
 Masa Tomiizu as Inspector Yamazaki Susumu
 Masato Ibu as Military Advisor Itō Koshitarō
 Jirō Sakagami as Inoue Genzaburō
 Yoshiaki Fujiwara as Samurai
 Tomorowo Taguchi as Samurai Tojiro Yuzawa
 Kei Satō as Narrator (voice)

Production
The original title of the film, Gohatto, is an old-fashioned term that can be translated as "against the law". Nowadays, "gohatto" can be translated as "strictly forbidden" or "taboo" ("tabu").

During the filming of Taboo, actor Ryuhei Matsuda was sixteen years old.

It was Nagisa Ōshima's final directorial effort.

Reception
Roger Ebert wrote that "Taboo is not an entirely successful film, but it isn't boring." Peter Bradshaw of The Guardian said that it was "a film which for some will be dismayingly impenetrable, but it is unmistakably the work of a master film-maker and a work of enormous strangeness and charm." 

The film was a financial success in Japan, grossing ¥1.01 billion and becoming one of the highest-grossing films of the year. The film was also given a limited theatrical release in North America where it grossed $114,425.

Home Video

From July 2020 through June 2021, the Criterion Channel streamed the film as part of the feature collection "Scores by Ryuichi Sakamoto". Criterion's description for the film was;

Accolades

It was nominated for the Palme d'Or at the 2000 Cannes Film Festival, losing out to Dancer in the Dark.

The film won four awards at the 2000 Blue Ribbon Awards: Best Director for Nagisa Ōshima, Best Film, Best New Actor for Ryuhei Matsuda, and Best Supporting Actor for Shinji Takeda.

Ryuhei Matsuda won the 2000 Japan Academy Prize for Newcomer of the Year; the film was nominated in nine other categories. Matsuda also won the Best New Actor category of the 2001 Kinema Junpo Awards, as well as the 2001 Yokohama Film Festival prize for Best New Talent.

Tadanobu Asano won the Best Supporting Actor category at the 2000 Hochi Film Awards.

Notes

References

External links
 
 
 
 

1999 films
1999 drama films
Japanese LGBT-related films
Gay-related films
Jidaigeki films
Samurai films
Films directed by Nagisa Ōshima
Films scored by Ryuichi Sakamoto
Films set in Bakumatsu
Shochiku films
19th century in LGBT history
1999 LGBT-related films
1990s Japanese films